San Sebastián Bay is located in the northern coast of Argentina's Tierra del Fuego Province. The bay is partly enclosed by the 17 km-long El Páramo spit that protrudes from the north. The spit is made of sand and gravel. At the place of bay relative sea level has an overall trend of fall during the last 7,000 years. Tides in the bay are large.

References

Bays of Argentina
Isla Grande de Tierra del Fuego